Area codes 503 and 971 are telephone area codes in the North American Numbering Plan (NANP) for the northwestern region of the U.S. state of Oregon. The numbering plan area (NPA) comprises the cities of Portland, Salem, and Astoria. Area code 503 was one of the original North American area codes of 1947, assigned to the entire state until 1995, when its extent was reduced to the northwest corner. Area code 971 was assigned to the service area in stages, completed in 2008, to form an overlay in the area with ten-digit dialing.

History
In the initial configuration of the nationwide telephone numbering plan designed by AT&T in 1947, the state of Oregon was assigned a single area code, 503. Despite Oregon's growth in the second half of the twentieth century, particularly in the Willamette Valley (Portland and Eugene), this remained so for 48 years, making Oregon one of the largest states by area with a single area code. By the early 1990s, the proliferation of cell phones and pagers, particularly in the Portland area, put this status in jeopardy with the threat of exhaustion of the telephone numbering pool. 

On November 5, 1995, the numbering plan area was restricted to the more densely populated northwestern corner of the state, including Portland. The rest of the state received the new area code 541.

Although this was intended as a long-term solution, the Portland area remained home to the great majority of Oregon's landlines, as well as most of its cell phones and pagers, the area continued to experience a shortage in telephone numbers. Within three years, further relief planning commenced. On July 1, 1999, area code 971 was created as a concentrated overlay for most of the numbering plan area, with the exceptions of Clatsop and Tillamook counties. Initially, ten-digit dialing was to become mandatory in that service area on January 30, 2000, but the date was extended until October 1, 2000. 

The previously exempted Clatsop and Tillamook counties were added to the overlay on April 27, 2008.

Service area
The service area includes the following counties:
 Clackamas County
 Clatsop County
 Columbia County
 Linn County (far northern parts, including Scio, Lyons, and Mill City)
 Marion County (except southernmost parts around Jefferson)
 Multnomah County
 Polk County
 Tillamook County
 Washington County
 Yamhill County

References

External links 

1947 establishments in Oregon
Telecommunications-related introductions in 1947
503
503